Sam Morril  is an American stand-up comedian, actor, writer, and producer.

Early life 
Morril grew up in New York City, the son of Ashkenazi Jewish parents. His mother, Marilyn Greenberg, is a painter and his stepfather is publishing industry attorney Mark Charles Morril. His maternal grandfather was George Greenberg, the former CEO of Loehmann's clothing store chain. In 1993, when he was seven years old, his mother and stepfather married and he thus adopted the Morril surname. He has two step-siblings. Through his biological father, whose surname is Elgort, Morril is the nephew of fashion photographer Arthur Elgort and the cousin of actor and singer Ansel Elgort. He attended the Browning School in Manhattan, and later graduated from Tulane University in New Orleans.

Career 
Morril was named one of Comedy Central's "Comics to Watch" in 2011 and has worked with comedians including Dave Attell, Marc Maron, Conan O'Brien, and Amy Schumer. He worked as an intern on The Colbert Report and later appeared on The Late Show with Stephen Colbert in April 2016. He has also made multiple appearances on Conan since 2014. He performed his stand-up routine on America's Got Talent in 2016, but did not win. His first one-hour special, Positive Influence, was released by Comedy Central in September 2018. His second one-hour special, I Got This, was released via Comedy Central's YouTube channel in February 2020. He is a regular on Comedy Central's This Week at the Comedy Cellar, performing frequently when not on tour. He had a cameo appearance as a comedian at an open mic night in the DC thriller film Joker (2019). He co-hosts the weekly podcast We Might be Drunk with comedian Mark Normand.

Personal life 
Morril was in a relationship with fellow comedian Taylor Tomlinson from March 2020 to February 2022.

Filmography

Comedy specials

Film

Television

Web

References

External links
 
 

American stand-up comedians
Living people
Comedians from New York (state)
American male comedians
American male television actors
Jewish American male comedians
21st-century American Jews
Year of birth missing (living people)